On April 7, 1994, Federal Express Flight 705, a McDonnell Douglas DC-10-30 cargo jet carrying electronics equipment across the United States from Memphis, Tennessee, to San Jose, California, was involved in a hijack attempt by Auburn R. Calloway. Calloway, a Federal Express employee, was facing possible dismissal for lying about his flight hours. He boarded the scheduled flight as a deadhead passenger carrying a guitar case concealing several hammers and a speargun. He tried to switch off the aircraft's cockpit voice recorder (CVR) before takeoff and, once airborne, kill the crew with hammers so their injuries would appear consistent with an accident rather than a hijacking. The CVR, though, was switched back on by the flight engineer, believing that he had neglected to turn it on.

Calloway intended to use the speargun as a last resort. He planned to crash the aircraft hoping that he would appear to be an employee killed in an accident. He sought to let his family collect on a $2.5 million life insurance policy provided by Federal Express. Calloway's efforts to kill the crew were unsuccessful. Despite severe injuries, the crew fought back, subdued Calloway, and landed the aircraft safely.

During his trial the prosecution argued Calloway was trying to commit suicide. Calloway's legal representation attempted to invoke an insanity defense, but he was found guilty of multiple charges, including attempted murder, attempted air piracy, and interference with flight crew operations. He received two consecutive life sentences with no chance of parole. Calloway successfully appealed the conviction for interference, which was ruled to be a lesser offense of attempted air piracy.

Flight crew and hijacker 
Three flight crew members were in the cockpit on this flight: 49-year-old Captain David G. "Dave" Sanders, who had worked for FedEx for 20 years and previously served with the U.S. Navy for nine years during the Vietnam War; 42-year-old First Officer James M. "Jim" Tucker Jr., who had worked for FedEx for 10 years and previously served with the U.S. Navy for 12 years during the Vietnam War and People Express Airlines for three years; and 39-year-old Flight Engineer Andrew H. "Andy" Peterson, who had worked for FedEx for 5 years.

Also in the airplane was 42-year-old FedEx flight engineer Auburn Calloway, an alumnus of Stanford University and a former Navy pilot and martial-arts expert, who was facing possible dismissal over falsifying of his flight hours. To disguise the hijacking as an accident, so his family would benefit from his US$2.5 million (equivalent to $ million in ) life-insurance policy, Calloway intended to murder the flight crew using blunt force. To accomplish this, he brought on board two claw hammers, two club hammers, a speargun, and a knife (which was not used) concealed inside a guitar case. He also carried with him a note written to his ex-wife and "describing the author's apparent despair". Just before the flight, Calloway had transferred over US$54,000 in securities and cashier's checks to his ex-wife.

Flight details 
Before takeoff, as part of his plan to disguise the intended attack as an accident, Calloway attempted to disable the cockpit voice recorder (CVR) by pulling its circuit breaker to interrupt CVR power. During the standard preflight checks, Peterson, the flight engineer, noticed the pulled breaker and reset it before takeoff, reactivating the CVR. However, if Calloway had killed the crew members with the CVR still on, he would simply have had to fly for 30 minutes to erase any trace of a struggle from the CVR's 30-minute loop.

26 minutes after takeoff, as the plane was passing 19,000 feet, and the flight crew carried on a casual conversation, Calloway went into the back to get his weapons, entered the flight deck, and attacked Peterson, Tucker, and Sanders. All three members of the crew received multiple hammer blows. Both Peterson and Tucker, the first officer, suffered fractured skulls, and Peterson's temporal artery was severed. The blow to Tucker's head drilled shards of bone into his brain and initially rendered him unable to move or react, but he was still conscious. Captain Sanders reported that during the beginning of the attack, he could not discern any emotion from Calloway, just "simply a face in his eyes".

When Calloway ceased his hammer attack, Peterson and Sanders began to get out of their seats to go after Calloway. Calloway left the cockpit and retrieved his speargun. He came back into the cockpit and threatened everyone to sit back down in their seats. Despite a loud ringing in his ear and being unbalanced and dazed, Peterson grabbed the gun by the spear between the barbs and the barrel. Tucker then put the DC-10 into a sharp 15-degree climb, and a lengthy struggle ensued, while Tucker, also an ex-Navy pilot, performed extreme aerial maneuvers with the aircraft. He pulled the plane into a sudden 15° climb, throwing Sanders, Peterson, and Calloway out of the cockpit and into the galley. To try to throw Calloway off balance, Tucker then turned the plane into a left roll, almost on its side. This rolled the combatants along the smoke curtain onto the left side of the galley. 

Eventually, Tucker had rolled the plane almost upside down at 140°, while attempting to maintain a visual reference of the environment around him through the windows. Peterson, Sanders, and Calloway were then pinned to the ceiling of the plane. Calloway managed to wrench his hammer hand free and hit Sanders in the head again. Just then, Tucker put the plane into a steep dive. This pushed the combatants back to the smoke curtain, but the wings and elevators started to flutter. At this point, Tucker could hear the wind rushing against the cockpit windows. This lack of control tested the aircraft’s safety limits. Tucker also began to sense a Mach tuck effect as the airflow over the wings approached the speed of sound. Tucker realized the throttles were at full power, increasing the speed of the aircraft. Releasing his only usable hand to pull back the throttles to idle, he managed to pull the plane out of the dive as it slowed down.

As the DC-10 leveled off at 5,000 feet, Calloway managed to hit Sanders again while the struggle continued, and this time the blow nearly knocked him unconscious. Sanders was losing strength, and Peterson was bleeding out from his ruptured temporal artery and was starting to go into shock. In spite of his diminishing strength, Sanders managed to grab the hammer out of Calloway's hand and attacked him with it. When the plane was completely level, Tucker alerted Memphis Center, telling them about the attack and requesting a vector back to Memphis. He requested an ambulance and "armed intervention", meaning he wanted a SWAT team to storm the plane.

The flight crew eventually succeeded in restraining and disarming Calloway, although only after moments of inverted and over-speed flight beyond the designed capabilities of a DC-10. Sanders took control, and Tucker, who by then had his sense of touch severely diminished and was paralyzed on the right side of his body, went back to assist Peterson in restraining Calloway. Sanders communicated with air traffic control, preparing for an emergency landing back at Memphis International Airport. Meanwhile, Calloway started fighting with the crew again.

Fully laden with fuel and cargo, the plane was approaching too fast and too high to land on the scheduled runway 9. Due to the plane's weight, speed, and height, it was at risk of breaking up upon landing under these conditions. Sanders requested by radio to land on the longer runway 36L. By that time, Calloway was defeated. Emergency personnel and police gained access to the plane via the escape slide and ladder. Inside, they found the interior of the galley and cockpit covered in blood. Calloway was then arrested, taken off the plane, and—along with Peterson, Tucker, and Sanders—was taken to a nearby hospital.

Aftermath 
The crew of Flight 705 survived the attack but were seriously injured. The left side of Tucker's skull was severely fractured, causing motor control problems in his right arm and right leg. Calloway had also dislocated Tucker's jaw, attempted to gouge out one of his eyes, and stabbed his right arm. Sanders suffered several deep gashes in his head, and doctors had to sew his right ear back in place. Flight engineer Peterson's skull was fractured and his temporal artery severed. The aircraft itself incurred $800,000 worth of damage.

Calloway pleaded temporary insanity, but was sentenced to two consecutive life sentences (federal sentences are not subject to parole) on August 11, 1995, for attempted murder and attempted air piracy. Calloway, Federal Bureau of Prisons inmate #14601-076, is imprisoned at USP Allenwood, in Pennsylvania. 

On May 26, 1994, the Air Line Pilots Association awarded Dave Sanders, Jim Tucker, and Andy Peterson the Gold Medal Award for heroism, the highest award a civilian pilot can receive. As of 2004, 10 years after the incident and due to the extent and severity of their injuries, none of the crew had been recertified as medically fit to fly commercially. However, Jim Tucker returned to recreational flying in his Luscombe 8A by 2002.

The McDonnell Douglas DC-10-30 aircraft involved, N306FE, remained in service after the incident, upgraded to MD-10 without the flight engineer position, and was the final MD-10 retired by FedEx on December 31, 2022. The plane first flew on November 5, 1985, and was delivered to FedEx on January 24, 1986.

On June 7, 2022, the aircraft was involved in another incident, where the crew received a cargo fire indication and diverted to Tulsa International Airport. None of the occupants on board were injured.

In popular culture 
The attempted hijacking of Flight 705 was featured in "Fight for Your Life", a season-three (2005) episode of the Canadian TV series Mayday (called Air Emergency and Air Disasters in the U.S., and Air Crash Investigation in the UK), which included interviews with the flight crew. The dramatization was broadcast with the title "Suicide Attack" in the United Kingdom, Australia, and Asia.

The sixth episode of UK TV series Black Box (called Survival in the Sky in the U.S.), "Sky Crimes", also features the attempted takeover using audio between air traffic control and the crew.

The book Hijacked: The True Story of the Heroes of Flight 705, written by Dave Hirschman, was published in 1997.

See also 
 Accidents and incidents involving the McDonnell Douglas DC-10 family
 List of accidents and incidents involving commercial aircraft

References

External links 

 Cockpit voice recorder transcript and incident summary
 Clips from the air traffic control tape
 

1994 in Tennessee
Accidents and incidents involving the McDonnell Douglas DC-10
Aircraft hijackings in the United States
Airliner accidents and incidents in Tennessee
Aviation accidents and incidents in the United States in 1994
Crimes in Tennessee
705
Aircraft hijackings
April 1994 events in the United States
Memphis International Airport